Amy Elise Jackson (born 8 August 1987) is an Australian women's soccer midfielder who plays for Melbourne Victory and the Boroondara Eagles in the Victorian Women's Premier League (WPL).

In the 2019–20 W-League season, Jackson won the goal of the year award for her round 7 goal against Perth Glory.

Jackson is Melbourne Victory's all-time record appearance holder and the club's second-highest goalscorer.

Honours
Melbourne Victory
 W-League Player of the Week: October 2014

References

External links
 Melbourne City player profile
 Melbourne Victory player profile

1987 births
Living people
Melbourne Victory FC (A-League Women) players
Melbourne City FC (A-League Women) players
A-League Women players
WK League players
Women's association football midfielders
Expatriate women's footballers in South Korea
Australian women's soccer players
Incheon Hyundai Steel Red Angels WFC players
Australian expatriate sportspeople in South Korea
People from Altona, Victoria
Soccer players from Melbourne
Sportswomen from Victoria (Australia)